The Éclaireuses et éclaireurs unionistes de France (EEUdF, approximate translation Unionist Guides and Scouts of France) are a Protestant Scouting and Guiding organization in France. The association serves 6,023 members and is affiliated to the Fédération du Scoutisme Français; it is also a member of the Protestant Federation of France.

History

Emblem

The emblem mirrors the evolution of the association. It is the old EUdF emblem enriched with a trefoil in the center to symbolize the merger with part of the PFF (girls) in 1970, lily flowers symbolizing the presence of boys. Until 1995, the logo included the word "federation" (again because of the merger with the FFE).

Program
The association is divided in three age-groups called "branches"; local units should work in all three branches:
 Branche cadette: Louvetaux/louvettes (Cub Scouts) - ages 8 to 12
 Branche moyenne: Eclaireurs/Eclaireuses (Boy Scouts/Girl Guides) - ages 12 to 16
 Branche aînée: Aînés/Aînées (Rover Scouts/Ranger Guides) - ages 16 to 19

The EEUdF runs an active Sea Scout section.

Ideals

Promise
Cub Scouts Avec l'aide de toute la Meute, je promets de faire de mon mieux pour:
 respecter la Loi et la Charte de la Meute
 connaître Jésus
 aider les autres
 et ...
Scouts and Guides Je promets de faire tout mon possible pour:
 écouter la parole de Dieu
 me mettre au service des autres
 vivre la loi de l'éclaireur
 et ...
Rovers Scouts and Ranger GuidesJe promets de faire tout mon possible pour :
 vivre l’idéal de la Loi
 donner du sens à ma vie
 m’engager au service des autres
 écouter la parole de Dieu
 et ...

Law
Cub ScoutsChaque Louveteau, chaque Louvette dans la bonne humeur, fait de son mieux, respecte les autres, et vit l'Aventure de la Meute.
Scouts and Guides Une Eclaireuse, un Eclaireur:
 ,
 ,
 ,
 ,
 ,
 ,
 .
Rovers Scouts and Ranger Guides Chaque Aînée, Chaque Aîné
 
 
 
 
 
 
 
 
 .

Motto
Cub Scouts De notre mieux.
Scouts and Guides Sois prêt(e)!
Rovers Scouts and Ranger Guides En route!

References

External links
 Official website

Scouting and Guiding in France
World Organization of the Scout Movement member organizations
World Association of Girl Guides and Girl Scouts member organizations
Youth organizations established in 1970